The 1996–97 National Soccer League season, was the 21st season of the National Soccer League in Australia.

Teams

Season overview
It was contested by 14 teams, and Brisbane Strikers won the championship. Perth Glory and Collingwood Warriors entered the competition.

Regular season

League table

Finals series

Grand Final

Individual awards
Player of the Year: Kresimir Marusic (Sydney United)
U-21 Player of the Year: Kasey Wehrman (Brisbane Strikers)
Top Scorer: David Zdrilic (Sydney United) – 21 goals
Coach of the Year: Branko Culina (Sydney United)

References
- NSL Awards
Australia - List of final tables (RSSSF)

National Soccer League (Australia) seasons
1996 in Australian soccer
1997 in Australian soccer
Aus
Aus